The 1968–69 Coppa Italia, the 22nd Coppa Italia was an Italian Football Federation domestic cup competition won by Roma.

Group stage

Group 1

Group 2

Group 3

Group 4

Group 5

Group 6

Group 7

Group 8

Group 9

Quarter-finals 
The top eight groupwinners of the group stage qualifier in the quarter-finals. Fell out the Atalanta.

Final group

Top goalscorers

References 

Coppa Italia seasons
Coppa Italia
Coppa Italia